Georgia elected its members on October 1, 1810.

See also 
 United States House of Representatives elections, 1810 and 1811
 List of United States representatives from Georgia

1810
Georgia
United States House of Representatives